The Santa Province is one of twenty provinces of the Ancash Region in Peru.

The province of Santa was created on February 12, 1821. Its capital, Chimbote, that long time ago became the first fishing port of the world, is the most important city of the coastal zone of Ancash.

In 1992 it was the site of a famous massacre of campesinos.

Geography 
The city and port of Santa are located in the large, fertile valleys of the Santa and Lacramarca rivers. These valleys have extensive sown plains with cotton, rice, sugar and nutritional products. The city of Santa is the first colonial city of the Ancash coast.

This rich valley is formed by the outlet of the Santa River. The Santa River is born in the lake Quñuqqucha in the Cordillera Blanca (White mountain range). It crosses the Callejón de Huaylas ("Alley of Huaylas") in all its extension.

Other mountains are listed below:

Political division
Santa is divided into nine districts, which are:

 Coishco 
 Santa 
 Chimbote 
 Macate 
 Cáceres del Perú 
 Nuevo Chimbote 
 Nepeña 
 Moro 
 Samanco

References

External links
 Official web site of the Santa Province

Santa Province